In Hinduism, Neela is known as Neelima or Neelamratna.  She is the first consort and the chief wife of Shani and mother of Kuligna. She balances and increases power of Shani and is the goddess of the gemstone Blue Sapphire gemstone. Her son Kuligna is a Rishi. Her husband, Shani, also married a Gandharva lady, Dhamini. She is daughter of Daksha and born from Prasuti.

See also
Bhadra
Chhaya
Dhamini
Saranyu
Surya
Tapti
Yamuna

References

Hindu goddesses